The Tory Party was a British political party between 1678 and 1834.

Tory Party may also refer to

United Kingdom

National 
The Conservative Party (UK), the modern British political party colloquially referred to as the Tory Party.

Regional 
 Ulster Unionist Party
 Unionist Party (Scotland)
 Gibraltar Social Democrats

Canada

Federal 
 The Conservative Party of Canada, since 2003, and predecessors:
 the Conservative Party of Canada (1867–1942)
 the Progressive Conservative Party of Canada, between 1942 and 2003

Regional 
 Progressive Conservative Association of Nova Scotia
 Progressive Conservative Party of Manitoba
 Progressive Conservative Party of New Brunswick
 Progressive Conservative Party of Newfoundland and Labrador
 Progressive Conservative Party of Ontario and predecessors:
 Family Compact (–1848)
 the Upper Canada Tories, a Canadian political movement between 1812 and 1867
 Progressive Conservative Party of Prince Edward Island
 Saskatchewan Party
 Progressive Conservative Party of Saskatchewan, decline
 United Conservative Party and predecessors:
 Progressive Conservative Association of Alberta (1905–2017)
 Yukon Party and predecessors:
 Yukon Progressive Conservative Party (1978–1991)
 Coalition Avenir Québec and predecessors:
 Action démocratique du Québec (1994–2011)
 Progressive Conservative Party of Quebec (1985–1989)
 Union Nationale (1935–1989)
 Conservative Party of Quebec (1867–1935)
 Parti bleu (1854–1867)
 British Columbia Conservative Party
 Splits
 Progressive Canadian Party
 Conservative Party of Quebec

United States 
 Loyalist (American Revolution)
 Southern Unionist, during the American Civil War, so called by their opponents
 The Tory Party, of the Yale Political Union

Australian 

 Australian Liberal Party

New Zealand 

 New Zealand National Party

Ireland 
 Irish Unionist Alliance and predecessor:
 Irish Conservative Party

See also 
Tory